"Make love, not war" is an anti-war slogan commonly associated with the American counterculture of the 1960s. It was used primarily by those who were opposed to the Vietnam War, but has been invoked in other anti-war contexts since, around the world.  The "Make love" part of the slogan often referred to the practice of free love that was growing among the American youth who denounced marriage as a tool for those who supported war and favored the traditional capitalist culture.

Several people claimed to be the inventor of the phrase, including Gershon Legman, Rod McKuen, radical activists Penelope and Franklin Rosemont and Tor Faegre, and Diane Newell Meyer, a senior at the University of Oregon in 1965, but the earliest uses in print appear to have been in anti-war protests in Berkeley, California earlier in 1965 than the April and May uses cited by Penelope Rosemont and Diane Newell Meyer. Articles mentioning signs and bumper stickers with the phrase were reported in the Daily Californian in February and the Oakland Tribune in March. Barbara Smoker claimed to have financed the manufacture of the first “Make Love, Not War” badges.

In popular culture
 
The slogan was featured in two 1973 songs: John Lennon's "Mind Games" and Bob Marley's "No More Trouble" (first released on the album Burnin').
It is also featured in the 1988 song "A Little Respect" by Erasure.
In the 1989 film Field of Dreams, fictional character Terence Mann is credited with coining the phrase.
David Allyn named his 2001 book after the slogan: Make Love, Not War: The Sexual Revolution: An Unfettered History.
The character of 'Pop', in the 2002 futuristic Queen musical play We Will Rock You, shouts "Make love, not war!" as he is brainwashed at the start of the show, which leads into the stage performance of "Radio Ga Ga".
In the 2019 film Avengers: Endgame, Stan Lee appears in his cameo driving past Camp Lehigh, shouting "Make love, not war!" to the army soldiers before driving off in his car.
in 2020 Jason Derulo and Nuka released the song "Love Not War".

See also

Breasts Not Bombs
Counterculture
Mike Love Not War
Peace movement
Vietnam War

References

1960s fads and trends
Opposition to United States involvement in the Vietnam War
Pacifism
Political catchphrases
Hippie movement
Sexual revolution
Counterculture of the 1960s
1965 neologisms